The Braschi family is an Italian noble family established in Cesena in the 12th century. The family achieved great notoriety with the election of one of its members, Giannangelo Braschi as Pope of the Catholic Church (Pius VI).

History 
The Braschi family arrived on the Italian peninsula in the 12th century, according to tradition, from Sweden, where the surname was originally Brasck or Brascke. At first they were in Alessandria, then in Vicenza, Rimini and finally in Cesena. During time, they acquired numerous noble titles.

Notable members 
Pius VI
Luigi Braschi Onesti, Duke of Nemi
Romoaldo Braschi-Onesti, Cardinal

Art collection 
Esquilache Immaculate Conception by Bartolomé Esteban Murillo (now at Hermitage Museum)
The Mystical marriage of Saint Catherine by Domenico Beccafumi (now at Hermitage Museum)
Equestrian portrait of Francisco de Moncada by Anthony van Dyck (now at Louvre)
Virgin and Child by Bernardino Fasolo (now at Louvre)
Madonna and Child with the Young Saint John by Giulio Romano (now at Louvre)
Christ Driving the Merchants from the Temple by Bartolomeo Manfredi (now at Musée des Beaux-Arts de Libourne)
Self-Portrait by Andrea del Sarto (now at Alnwick Castle)

Notable buildings 
Palazzo Braschi in Rome
Palazzo Braschi in Cesena
Palazzo Braschi in Terracina
Rocca Sinibalda Castle
Villa Torlonia in San Mauro Pascoli

References 
Williams, George L. (1998) Papal Genealogy: The Families and Descendants of the Popes Jefferson:McFarland & Company Inc.
Antrobus, Frederick (ed.) (1952) The History of the Popes from the Close of the Middle Ages London:Regan Paul Ltd

Papal families